Stenophorina is a genus of flies in the family Phoridae.

Species
Stenophorina petiolata Borgmeier, 1963

References

Phoridae
Platypezoidea genera